Genocidal intent is the mens rea for the crime of genocide. "Intent to destroy" is one of the elements of the crime of genocide according to the 1948 Genocide Convention. There are some analytic differences between the concept of intent under national criminal law, where responsibility for a murder is ascribed to an individual based on their mental state, and international law. Under international law, responsibility falls upon individuals in their capacities as members of certain organizations or other official roles. The intent for genocide is less direct. An international court might look at whether the defendant participated in planning the genocidal acts, perhaps within the auspices of a certain organizational structure, or whether they acted with knowledge of such a preconceived plan.

The Tribunal for Rwanda, in one of their cases, decided that it was not enough for a defendant to know that their acts could contribute to the destruction of a group. Scholars have suggested that the individual's role within an institution can impact the weight given to an individual's knowledge. In order to prosecute of an individual in the context of a genocide, their complicity in forming the "institutional intent" must also be proved. The International Criminal Tribunal for Yugoslavia (ICTY), International Criminal Tribunal for Rwanda (ICTR), and International Court of Justice  have ruled that, in the absence of a confession, genocidal intent can be proven with circumstantial evidence, especially "the scale of atrocities committed, their general nature, in a region or a country, or furthermore, the fact of deliberately and systematically targeting victims on account of their membership of a particular group, while excluding the members of other groups."

Cases
In 2010, the Khmer Rouge Tribunal referred to the precedent of the ICTR in discussing the role of genocidal intent.

In the case of a 2004 United Nations Commission of Inquiry into the War in Darfur, Claus Kress argued that the ICTY and ICTR were incorrect in their view of the genocidal intent of individuals. Hans Vest argued for the interlinked roles of an individual's intent and the individual's expectation of contributing to a collective action. Kjell Anderson discussed ways of separating out the roles of collective policies and their interaction with individual intent.

Olaf Jenssen disagreed with the lack of sentencing Goran Jelisić for genocidal intent, arguing that legal consistency would imply that some of the perpetrators of the Holocaust would not have been convicted for genocide.

In February 2021, while the Tigray War was in its fourth month, peace researcher Kjetil Tronvoll stated that the Eritrean Defence Forces' acts of widespread and systematic executions of Tigrayan civilians, especially men and boys, sexual violence against Tigrayan women, looting and destruction of infrastructure and food resources, and looting and destruction of Tigrayan cultural heritage, together seemed to show a pattern that might establish genocidal intent.

Denial
Edina Bećirević studied whether there was a "special intent" by the Serbian political leadership to exterminate Bosnian Muslims as early as 1992" in the Bosnian War.

See also 
 "What Russia should do with Ukraine", 2022 article by Russian propagandist Timofey Sergeytsev
 War crimes in the 2022 Russian invasion of Ukraine#Genocide

References 

Elements of crime
Genocide
Intention